Lunga Point is a promontory on the northern coast of Guadalcanal, the site of a naval battle during World War II.  It was also the name of a nearby airfield, later named Henderson Field.  is also the name of a United States Navy escort carrier that operated in World War II.

Eleven thousand US Marines landed at Lunga Point on August 7, 1942, in order to capture the airfield being constructed by the Imperial Japanese Navy before it could become 
operational, beginning the Guadalcanal Campaign.

References

Site discussing this and other Guadalcanal battle sites

Guadalcanal
Headlands of the Solomon Islands